Halspiviridae is a family of viruses that consists of a single genus, Salterprovirus, which consists of a single recognised species; Salterprovirus His1 (hereafter, 'His1'). This virus was isolated from hypersaline water in Australia and was able to be cultured on the halophilic archaeon Haloarcula hispanica. Like many other archaeoviruses, His1 has an approximately limoniform (lemon-shaped) virion.

Etymology 
The family name, Halspiviridae, is derived from halophilic and spindle-shaped, in reference to the habitat and virion morphology, respectively. The genus name, Salterprovirus, is derived from salty terminal protein virus, as the linear dsDNA genome has proteins attached to the 5′ termini.

Taxonomy 
The virion has a spindle-shaped morphology and is similar in shape to that of viruses infecting thermophilic archaea, the Fuselloviridae, and His1 was originally described as a probable member of that group. However, it was later found that there is no genetic relationship and their replication strategies are entirely different, and so His1 was classified into a new group, genus Salterprovirus within the family Halspiviridae. Halspiviridae has not been classified within any higher-ranked taxa.

Environmental DNA sequences derived from Namib salt pans indicate the presence of currently unrecognised, distant relatives of His1.

Another species of virus, now named Gammapleolipovirus His2 (hereafter 'His2'), was originally considered to be related to His1, but later analysis of the His2 virion revealed that this species actually belongs to the family Pleolipoviridae.

Structure 
The virus is enveloped, with limoniform or spindle-shaped morphology. Genomes are linear, around 14.5kb in length. The genome has 35 open reading frames. A negatively stained electron microscope (EM) picture of His1 virions is shown on the right of this page. There is some variation in particle length (e.g. example seen left of centre), but most display the typical limoniform capsid with a short tail. High resolution micrographs and cryoEM reconstructions have been published by Hong et al. (2015), who gave average dimensions of 92 x 40 nm with a 12 nm tail.

Replication cycle 
Viral replication is cytoplasmic. Entry into the host cell is achieved by virus attachment to the host cell. An adsorption rate constant for His1 of 1.9 x 10−12 ml min−1 has been experimentally determined by Pietilä et al. (2013). DNA-templated transcription is the method of transcription. Haloarcula hispanica may serve as a host. Transmission occurs via passive diffusion.

Genome 

The linear, dsDNA genome of His1 consists of 14,464 base-pairs (bp), has imperfect inverted terminal repeat sequences of 105 bp, and is annotated to carry 35 protein coding genes, including a gene specifying a protein-primed DNA polymerase (B-family). The ends of the genome have a protein attached. The protein sequence of the polymerase is 42% identical to the polymerase specified by the gammapleolipovirus His2, even though the two viruses belong to very different taxonomic groups.

References

External links 

 Viralzone: Salterprovirus
 International Committee on Taxonomy of Viruses (ICTV)

Double-stranded DNA viruses
Virus genera
Virus families